Tingsryd Municipality (Tingsryds kommun) is a municipality in Småland, southern Sweden, in southeastern Kronoberg County, where the town Tingsryd is seat.

The present municipality was formed by the local government reform of 1971 when the market town (köping) Tingsryd (instituted in 1921) was amalgamated with its surrounding entities.

Tingsryd is most famous for its hockey team Tingsryds AIF. The club has delivered several players to the NHL and are currently playing in Hockeyallsvenskan.

Tingsryd Municipality refers to itself as the "Horse Capital" because of a close connection to horses; they are housing nearly 2,000 horses. The new Tingsryd horse racing track (opened 27 July 2003) is the only one in Northern Europe being a mile (1,609 m) long and gathers every kind of equestrian sport.

Geography
Tingsryd Municipality is located in an area of traditional Mid-Sweden forestry, with some agriculture areas, and the geography is also taken up by many small lakes. Much of the population (38% estimated) of the municipality still live in rural areas, the rest live in almost equally populated small towns, without any densely populated central city in the municipality.

The Mien crater, the result of a meteorite impact some 120 million years ago, lies 11 km southwest of Tingsryd. Being sparsely populated, it is regarded as a safe environment far from urban stress.

Localities
There are 7 urban areas (also called a Tätort or locality) in Tingsryd Municipality.

In the table the localities are listed according to the size of the population as of December 31, 2018. The municipal seat is in bold characters.

Sights
In the forest near the town of Ryd there is a remotely located car cemetery with cars from 1930–1960. It is visited by some 1,000 people interested in curiosities every year.

References
Statistics Sweden

External links

Tingsryd Municipality - Official site

Municipalities of Kronoberg County